The Plastic Club is an arts organization located in Philadelphia, Pennsylvania. Founded in 1897 for women only, the Plastic Club is one of the oldest art clubs in the United States. It is located on the 200 block of Camac Street, the "Little Street of Clubs" that was a cultural destination in the early 1900s. Since 1991, the club's membership also includes men.

History
The Plastic Club was founded by art educator Emily Sartain. It was founded as an arts organization for women to promote collaboration and members' works, partly in response to the Philadelphia Sketch Club, an exclusively male arts club. The first President was the etcher Blanche Dillaye. The motto of the club was taken from a poem by Theophile Gautier:

The Plastic Club insignia was designed by Elisabeth Hallowell Saunders.

The club offered art classes, social events, and exhibitions. Its annual masquerade party was called "the Rabbit."

Early members included Elenore Plaisted Abbott, Paula Himmelsbach Balano, Cecilia Beaux, Fern Coppedge, Elizabeth Shippen Green, Charlotte Harding, Frances Tipton Hunter, Violet Oakley, Emily and Harriet Sartain, Jessie Willcox Smith, and Alice Barber Stephens, many of whom had been students of Howard Pyle. When the fall exhibition was held in 1898, the works of Pyle's former students—Elizabeth Fearne Bonsall, Elizabeth Shippen Green, Jessie Willcox Smith, Charlotte Harding, Violet Oakley, and Angela De Cora—were singled out.

In 1918, the club was involved in the founding of the Philadelphia School of Occupational Therapy, reflecting the connection between occupational therapy and the Arts and Crafts movement in the United States between the Civil War and World War I.

In 1991 the organization opened its membership to include men. During the 1990s the club also sought to attract art students, offering free membership to two recent graduates a year.

The Plastic Club building at 247 South Camac Street was added to the Philadelphia Register of Historic Places in 1962.

Noted past members
The Plastic Club has identified the following noted past members:

 Elenore Plaisted Abbott
 Paula Himmelsbach Balano
 Cecilia Beaux
 Mary Carnell
 Fern T. Coppedge
 Blanche Dillaye
 Grace Gebbie Wiederseim Drayton 
 Beatrice Fenton
 Beatrice Fox
 Elizabeth Shippen Green
 Violet Oakley
 Amy Otis
 Esther Richards
Harriet Roosevelt Richards
 Harriet Sartain
 Emily Sartain
 Jessie Willcox Smith
 Wuanita Smith
 Alice Barber Stephens
 Alice Kent Stoddard
 Beatrice Pastorius Turner
 Sarah Stilwell Weber
 Mathilde Weil

References

Further reading

External links
 
 Finding Aid for The Plastic Club Records, 1888-2007, The Historical Society of Pennsylvania.

Feminist art organizations in the United States
Women's organizations based in the United States
Women's clubs in the United States
Arts organizations based in Pennsylvania
Organizations based in Philadelphia
Arts organizations established in the 1890s
Organizations established in 1897
1897 establishments in Pennsylvania
History of women in Pennsylvania